Othello is a 1965 film based on the National Theatre Company's staging of Shakespeare's Othello (1964-1966) staged by John Dexter. Directed by Stuart Burge, the film stars Laurence Olivier, Maggie Smith, Joyce Redman, and Frank Finlay, who all received Oscar nominations, and provided film debuts for both Derek Jacobi and Michael Gambon.

Background
The film retains most of Shakespeare's original play, and does not change the order of scenes, as do Olivier's Hamlet and Richard III. The only major omission is the Fool's scene, although other minor lines are cut here and there, though the stage version contained more of the play than the film. Derek Jacobi (Cassio) and Michael Gambon all made their film debuts in Othello, while Edward Hardwicke (Montano) would go on to work with the National for seven years.

The film of Othello used enlarged duplicates of the original stage settings, rather than having elaborate new sets built. Olivier's former backers for his Shakespeare films were all deceased by 1965, and he was unable to raise the money to do a film version on location or on elaborate sets. Nearly a decade earlier, Olivier had been attempting to find financial backing for his own film version of Macbeth after he performed the role in 1955 at Stratford, but ultimately without success. The National Theatre Company had already produced a staged film of Chekhov's Uncle Vanya (1963) and would later produce Strindberg's The Dance of Death (1969). The Olivier Othello is the first English-language filmed version of the play made in color (there had been a Russian version in color in 1955) and widescreen. It was the second major film adaption of the work after a production in 1952 by Orson Welles. In the U.S., it did not play the usual several-week run given to most films; instead, it played for only two days. The film was exhibited as a roadshow presentation.

Of all Olivier's Shakespeare films, Othello is the one with the least music. Iago and the soldiers sing a drinking song in one scene, and in another, musicians are seen playing briefly on exotic instruments, but, otherwise, the film has no music.

Reception
Olivier played Othello in blackface. He also adopted an exotic accent of his own invention, developed a special walk, and learned how to speak in a voice considerably deeper than his normal one. Columnist Inez Robb disparagingly compared Olivier's performance to Al Jolson in The Jazz Singer. She described Olivier's performance as "high camp", and said "I was certainly in tune with the gentleman sitting next to me who kept asking 'When does he sing Mammy?" Film critic Pauline Kael gave the production and Olivier's portrayal one of her most glowing reviews, shaming the major movie studios for giving Olivier so little money to make the film that he and the public had to be content with what was almost literally a filmed stage production, while other films received multimillion dollar budgets. John Simon, while disagreeing with the approach the production's interpretation took, declared that, "Olivier plays this misconceived Othello spectacularly, in a manner that is always a perverse joy to behold".

One particular thing which has caused distinctive amounts of offense, and a device which primarily works in film rather than on-stage, was Olivier's rolling of his eyes: a mannerism often shown in early depictions of black people in blackface films. This device specifically links to Al Jolson and is unconnected to any Shakespearean-era stage direction.

It remains the only Shakespeare film in which all the principals were nominated for Oscars. Finlay (Iago) was nominated for Best Supporting Actor despite having the role with the most lines in the play: 1117 to Olivier's 856. Olivier does, however, appear on screen three minutes longer than Finlay.

In 2021 music professor Bright Sheng stepped down from teaching a University of Michigan undergraduate musical composition class, where he says he had intended to show how Giuseppe Verdi adapted William Shakespeare's play Othello into his opera Otello, after a controversy over his showing the movie, allegedly without giving students a warning that it contained blackface. The World Socialist Web Site called the matter a "right-wing, racialist attack" on Sheng, adding that Laurence Olivier's blackface, far from being racist, was actually a deliberate rejection of earlier "semi-racist approaches" that had portrayed Othello as light-skinned, and of "commentators appalled at the thought of the white maiden Desdemona falling head over heels in love with a black man."

Cast
Laurence Olivier as Othello
Maggie Smith as Desdemona
Joyce Redman as Emilia
Frank Finlay as Iago
Derek Jacobi as Cassio
Robert Lang as Roderigo
Kenneth Mackintosh as Lodovico
Anthony Nicholls as Brabantio
Sheila Reid as Bianca
Edward Hardwicke as Montano
Michael Gambon as Senator/Soldier/Cypriot

See also

Shakespeare on screen
1965 in film

References

External links

British drama films
1965 films
1965 drama films
Films based on Othello
Films directed by Stuart Burge
Films produced by Anthony Havelock-Allan
Films set in the 16th century
Films set in Venice
Films set in Cyprus
Blackface minstrel shows and films
1960s English-language films
1960s British films
Blackface theatre